Muscle Shoals High School (MSHS) is the sole public secondary education institution in Muscle Shoals, Alabama. MSHS has been awarded the Blue Ribbon Lighthouse Award for Excellence.

Academics 
Based on the Alabama Reading and Math Test scores, the system has consistently placed among the top 10 school districts in one or more areas in most grade levels. In 2017, AL.com ranked Muscle Shoals High School in the top 20 Alabama high schools for science and math.

Band

The Muscle Shoals High School band program was founded in 1965. The marching band has received Superior ratings every year since 1966, along with First Place, Best in Class, and Grand Champion awards. In 2001, they traveled to Atlanta, Georgia to be the first band from Alabama to compete in Bands of America (BOA). Since then, the band has been Class A Champions in Atlanta four times (2002, 2003, 2004, 2005). At the Alabama Bandmasters Association State Festival, the Muscle Shoals High School Symphonic Band has earned Superiors for the past 13 consecutive years. In 2005, the band traveled to Orlando, Florida to compete in the All-Star Music Festival. There they were awarded Grand Champions in Parade Band, Concert Band, Concert Percussion, and Jazz Band. In 2009, they returned to the Orlando All-Star Music Festival to receive the Grand Champion title in Concert Band, Concert Percussion, and Jazz Band.

During the 2007–08 season, the marching band won the Grand Champion trophy at the Dixie Pride Marching Classic and the Vanderbilt Marching Invitational and won 3rd Place in Class A at the Bands of America Atlanta Super Regional.

The marching band was awarded two Grand Champion awards and 3rd place in The Heart of Dixie competition with their show "The Piano Lesson". The concert band made superior ratings at MPAs and went to Disney World to compete. They also had the opportunity to rename the MSHS auditorium in honor of former band director Charles R. Stratford at their Spring Concert.

Percussion
The Muscle Shoals High School Percussion Ensemble has earned numerous awards as a member of the Southeastern Color Guard Circuit (SCGC) and Winter Guard International (WGI) since 2008. They have competed in the Percussion Scholastic Concert Open Class (PSCO) and the Percussion Scholastic Concert World Class (PSCW). The latter is for scholastic percussion groups that perform concert music programs of the highest difficulty in both SCGC and WGI. The Muscle Shoals Percussion Ensemble were WGI Scholastic Concert Open Champions in 2009 and 2022 and WGI Scholastic Concert World Champions in 2011.

Past and Current Programs

Notable alumni
Jason Allen – former cornerback for the Houston Texans, the Cincinnati Bengals, and the Miami Dolphins
Dennis Homan – former wide receiver for the Dallas Cowboys and the Kansas City Chiefs
Leigh Tiffin – former place kicker for the Alabama Crimson Tide
Rece Davis – ESPN college football personality
Rachel Wammack – country music singer
Adam Berry – reality television personality for Kindred Spirits, Ghost Hunters, and Ghost Hunters Academy

References

External links
Muscle Shoals City School System
Alabama High School Athletic Association
Alabama Music Educators Association

Public high schools in Alabama
Educational institutions established in 1962
Schools in Colbert County, Alabama
1962 establishments in Alabama